The Battle of Rogue River is a 1954 American Western film starring George Montgomery, Martha Hyer, and Richard Denning, directed by William Castle and produced by Sam Katzman. The screenplay is written by Douglas Heyes. It is set during the Rogue River Wars in the Oregon Territory but features the standard costumes of a post American Civil War western and was filmed on the Newhall Ranch, California.

Plot 
In the Oregon Territory prior to the American Civil War, Chief Mike (Michael Granger) has fought the US Army and the white settlers to a standstill. As a result, the post commander Major Wallach (Willis Bouchey) is replaced by Major Archer (George Montgomery). On the way to the fort, Major Archer's troop of cavalry accompanied by two field guns spot an ambush by Chief Mike's Indians. Major Archer orders one of the guns to fire knocking down a tree and panicking the "braves" who suffer no casualties.

On arrival at the Fort, Major Wallach has allowed the use of his barracks to recruit more Irregulars for Stacey Wyatt (Richard Denning) who accompany the regulars on their military expeditions. As the recruiting involves free alcohol and kisses by women to the volunteers (and to their Regular comrades-in-arms) Major Archer is furious and immediately takes command of the post to reinstall military discipline, retrain the men and plan another expedition. No one is more outraged than Sergeant Major McClain's (Emory Parnell) daughter Brett (Martha Hyer) who thinks Archer inhuman.

An emissary of Chief Mike comes to arrange a meeting between the new commander to discuss peace but Major Archer initially refuses until orders come for him to negotiate with the Indians. The Major and Chief meet with each respecting each other and arranging a thirty-day truce with the Indians and whites not crossing either side of the Rogue River.

Wyatt is secretly employed to keep the Indian wars going by a consortium of the territory's business community (mining, ranching, lumber, fur trade) who oppose Statehood that would ruin their profits. Wyatt tricks Sgt Major McClain into breaking the treaty by telling him the Indians have attacked a white settlement leading to all but McClain killed after they attack an Indian settlement.

Cast

References

External links 
 
 
 
 
Review of film at Variety

1954 films
1954 Western (genre) films
American Western (genre) films
Columbia Pictures films
Films directed by William Castle
Films set in Oregon
Films set in the 1880s
Western (genre) cavalry films
1950s English-language films
1950s American films